Jefrud-e Bala (also Romanized as Jefrūd-e Bālā; also known as Dzhufru, Jafrūd, Jefrūd, Jīfrūd, Jufru, and Jufrūd) is a village in Chapar Khaneh Rural District, Khomam District, Rasht County, Gilan Province, Iran. At the 2006 census, its population was 366, in 119 families.

References 

Populated places in Rasht County